Albert Thomas Sutton (11 December 1874 – 2 November 1946) was an Australian politician who represented the South Australian House of Assembly multi-member seat of East Torrens from 1927 to 1930 for the Liberal Federation.

In local politics, he was mayor of the Corporate Town of St Peters from 1923 to 1926.

References

1874 births
1946 deaths
Members of the South Australian House of Assembly
Mayors of places in South Australia